Missouri was admitted to the Union on August 10, 1821. Its current U.S. senators are Republicans Josh Hawley (Class 1, serving since 2019) and Eric Schmitt (Class 3, serving since 2023). Francis Cockrell was Missouri's longest-serving senator (1875–1905).

List of senators 

|- style="height:2em"
! rowspan=19 | 1
| rowspan=19 align=left | Thomas Hart Benton
| rowspan=2  | Democratic-Republican
| rowspan=19 nowrap | Aug 10, 1821 –Mar 3, 1851
| rowspan=3 | Elected in 1821.
| rowspan=3 | 1
| 
| rowspan=2 | 1
| rowspan=2 | Elected in 1821.
| rowspan=5 nowrap | Aug 10, 1821 –Mar 3, 1831
| rowspan=2  | Democratic-Republican
| rowspan=5 align=right | David Barton
! rowspan=5 | 1

|- style="height:2em"
| 

|- style="height:2em"
| rowspan=8  | Jacksonian
| 
| rowspan=3 | 2
| rowspan=3 | Re-elected in 1825.Lost re-election.
| rowspan=3  | NationalRepublican

|- style="height:2em"
| rowspan=3 | Re-elected in 1827.
| rowspan=3 | 2
| 

|- style="height:2em"
| 

|- style="height:2em"
| 
| rowspan=5 | 3
| rowspan=2 | Elected in 1830.Died.
| rowspan=2 nowrap | Mar 4, 1831 –Jun 6, 1833
| rowspan=2  | Jacksonian
| rowspan=2 align=right | Alexander Buckner
! rowspan=2 | 2

|- style="height:2em"
| rowspan=5 | Re-elected in 1833.
| rowspan=5 | 3
| rowspan=3 

|- style="height:2em"
|  
| nowrap | Jun 6, 1833 –Oct 25, 1833
| colspan=3 | Vacant

|- style="height:2em"
| rowspan=2 | Appointed to continue Buckner's term.Elected to finish Buckner's term.
| rowspan=6 nowrap | Oct 25, 1833 –Oct 3, 1843
| rowspan=2  | Jacksonian
| rowspan=6 align=right | Lewis F. Linn
! rowspan=6 | 3

|- style="height:2em"
| 

|- style="height:2em"
| rowspan=9  | Democratic
| 
| rowspan=3 | 4
| rowspan=3 | Re-elected in 1836.
| rowspan=4  | Democratic

|- style="height:2em"
| rowspan=5 | Re-elected in 1839.
| rowspan=5 | 4
| 

|- style="height:2em"
| 

|- style="height:2em"
| rowspan=3 
| rowspan=5 | 5
| Re-elected in 1842.Died.

|- style="height:2em"
|  
| nowrap | Oct 3, 1843 –Oct 14, 1843
| colspan=3 | Vacant

|- style="height:2em"
| rowspan=3 | Appointed to continue Linn's term.Elected to finish Linn's term.
| rowspan=6 nowrap | Oct 14, 1843 –Mar 3, 1855
| rowspan=6  | Democratic
| rowspan=6 align=right | David Rice Atchison
! rowspan=6 | 4

|- style="height:2em"
| rowspan=3 | Re-elected in 1845.Lost re-election.
| rowspan=3 | 5
| 

|- style="height:2em"
| 

|- style="height:2em"
| 
| rowspan=3 | 6
| rowspan=3 | Re-elected in 1849.Lost re-election.

|- style="height:2em"
! rowspan=4 | 2
| rowspan=4 align=left | Henry S. Geyer
| rowspan=4  | Whig
| rowspan=4 nowrap | Mar 4, 1851 –Mar 3, 1857
| rowspan=4 | Elected in 1851.Retired.
| rowspan=4 | 6
| 

|- style="height:2em"
| 

|- style="height:2em"
| rowspan=2 
| rowspan=4 | 7
| Failure to elect.
| nowrap | Mar 4, 1855 –Jan 12, 1857
| colspan=3 | Vacant

|- style="height:2em"
| rowspan=3 | Elected late in 1857.Retired or lost re-election.
| rowspan=3 nowrap | Jan 12, 1857 –Mar 3, 1861
| rowspan=3  | Democratic
| rowspan=3 align=right | James S. Green
! rowspan=3 | 5

|- style="height:2em"
! rowspan=4 | 3
| rowspan=4 align=left | Trusten Polk
| rowspan=4  | Democratic
| rowspan=4 nowrap | Mar 4, 1857 –Jan 10, 1862
| rowspan=4 | Elected in 1857.Expelled for supporting the Confederacy in the American Civil War.
| rowspan=6 | 7
| 

|- style="height:2em"
| 

|- style="height:2em"
| rowspan=4 
| rowspan=7 | 8
|  
| nowrap | Mar 4, 1861 –Mar 17, 1861
| colspan=3 | Vacant

|- style="height:2em"
| Elected late in 1861.Expelled for supporting the Confederacy in the American Civil War.
| nowrap | Mar 17, 1861 –Jan 10, 1862
|  | Democratic
| align=right | Waldo Johnson
! 6

|- style="height:2em"
| colspan=3 | Vacant
| nowrap | Jan 10, 1862 –Jan 17, 1862
|  
|  
| nowrap | Jan 10, 1862 –Jan 17, 1862
| colspan=3 | Vacant

|- style="height:2em"
! rowspan=5 | 4
| rowspan=5 align=left | John B. Henderson
|  | Unionist
| rowspan=5 nowrap | Jan 17, 1862 –Mar 3, 1869
| Appointed to finish Polk's term.
| rowspan=2 | Appointed to continue Johnson's term.Successor qualified.
| rowspan=2 nowrap | Jan 17, 1862 –Nov 13, 1863
|  | Unionist
| rowspan=2 align=right | Robert Wilson
! rowspan=2 | 7

|- style="height:2em"
| rowspan=2  | UnconditionalUnionist
| rowspan=4 | Elected to the next term in 1863.Retired.
| rowspan=4 | 8
| rowspan=2 
|  | UnconditionalUnionist

|- style="height:2em"
| rowspan=2 | Elected to finish Johnson's term.Retired due to ill health.
| rowspan=2 nowrap | Nov 13, 1863 –Mar 3, 1867
|  | UnconditionalUnionist
| rowspan=2 align=right | Benjamin Gratz Brown
! rowspan=2 | 8

|- style="height:2em"
| rowspan=2  | Republican
| 
|  | Republican

|- style="height:2em"
| 
| rowspan=5 | 9
| rowspan=2 | Elected in 1866 or 1867.Resigned to become Chief Justice of the U.S. Court of Claims.
| rowspan=2 nowrap | Mar 4, 1867 –Dec 19, 1870
| rowspan=2  | Republican
| rowspan=2 align=right | Charles D. Drake
! rowspan=2 | 9

|- style="height:2em"
! rowspan=5 | 5
| rowspan=5 align=left | Carl Schurz
|  | Republican
| rowspan=5 nowrap | Mar 4, 1869 –Mar 3, 1875
| rowspan=5 | Elected in 1868.Retired.
| rowspan=5 | 9
| rowspan=2 

|- style="height:2em"
| rowspan=2  | Liberal Republican
| Appointed to continue Drake's term.Retired when successor elected.
| nowrap | Dec 19, 1870 –Jan 20, 1871
|  | Republican
| align=right | Daniel T. Jewett
! 10

|- style="height:2em"
| rowspan=2 
| rowspan=2 | Elected to finish Drake's term.Lost re-election.
| rowspan=2 nowrap | Jan 20, 1871 –Mar 3, 1873
| rowspan=2  | Democratic
| rowspan=2 align=right | Francis P. Blair
! rowspan=2 | 11

|- style="height:2em"
| rowspan=2  | Republican

|- style="height:2em"
| 
| rowspan=6 | 10
| rowspan=3 | Elected in 1872 or 1873.Died.
| rowspan=3 nowrap | Mar 4, 1873 –Sep 20, 1877
| rowspan=3  | Democratic
| rowspan=3 align=right | Lewis V. Bogy
! rowspan=3 | 12

|- style="height:2em"
! rowspan=18 | 6
| rowspan=18 align=left | Francis Cockrell
| rowspan=18  | Democratic
| rowspan=18 nowrap | Mar 4, 1875 –Mar 3, 1905
| rowspan=6 | Elected in 1874.
| rowspan=6 | 10
| 

|- style="height:2em"
| rowspan=4 

|- style="height:2em"
|  
| nowrap | Sep 20, 1877 –Sep 29, 1877
| colspan=3 | Vacant

|- style="height:2em"
| Appointed to continue Bogy's term.Retired.
| nowrap | Sep 29, 1877 –Jan 26, 1879
|  | Democratic
| align=right | David H. Armstrong
! 13

|- style="height:2em"
| Elected to finish Bogy's term.Retired.
| nowrap | Jan 27, 1879 –Mar 3, 1879
|  | Democratic
| align=right | James Shields
! 14

|- style="height:2em"
| 
| rowspan=3 | 11
| rowspan=3 | Elected in 1879.
| rowspan=12 nowrap | Mar 4, 1879 –Mar 3, 1903
| rowspan=12  | Democratic
| rowspan=12 align=right | George G. Vest
! rowspan=12 | 15

|- style="height:2em"
| rowspan=3 | Re-elected in 1881.
| rowspan=3 | 11
| 

|- style="height:2em"
| 

|- style="height:2em"
| 
| rowspan=3 | 12
| rowspan=3 | Re-elected in 1885.

|- style="height:2em"
| rowspan=3 | Re-elected in 1887.
| rowspan=3 | 12
| 

|- style="height:2em"
| 

|- style="height:2em"
| 
| rowspan=3 | 13
| rowspan=3 | Re-elected in 1891.

|- style="height:2em"
| rowspan=3 | Re-elected in 1893.
| rowspan=3 | 13
| 

|- style="height:2em"
| 

|- style="height:2em"
| 
| rowspan=3 | 14
| rowspan=3 | Re-elected in 1897.Retired.

|- style="height:2em"
| rowspan=3 | Re-elected in 1899.Lost re-election.
| rowspan=3 | 14
| 

|- style="height:2em"
| 

|- style="height:2em"
| 
| rowspan=4 | 15
| rowspan=4 | Elected in 1903.
| rowspan=9 nowrap | Mar 4, 1903 –Apr 14, 1918
| rowspan=9  | Democratic
| rowspan=9 align=right | William J. Stone
! rowspan=9 | 16

|- style="height:2em"
| colspan=3 | Vacant
| nowrap | Mar 4, 1905 –Mar 18, 1905
|  
| rowspan=4 | 15
| rowspan=2 

|- style="height:2em"
! rowspan=3 | 7
| rowspan=3 align=left | William Warner
| rowspan=3  | Republican
| rowspan=3 nowrap | Mar 18, 1905 –Mar 3, 1911
| rowspan=3 | Elected late in 1905.Retired.

|- style="height:2em"
| 

|- style="height:2em"
| 
| rowspan=3 | 16
| rowspan=3 | Re-elected in 1909.

|- style="height:2em"
! rowspan=15 | 8
| rowspan=15 align=left | James A. Reed
| rowspan=15  | Democratic
| rowspan=15 nowrap | Mar 4, 1911 –Mar 3, 1929
| rowspan=3 | Elected in 1910.
| rowspan=3 | 16
| 

|- style="height:2em"
| 

|- style="height:2em"
| 
| rowspan=6 | 17
| rowspan=2 | Re-elected in 1914.Died.

|- style="height:2em"
| rowspan=6 | Re-elected in 1916.
| rowspan=6 | 17
| rowspan=4 

|- style="height:2em"
|  
| nowrap | Apr 14, 1918 –Apr 30, 1918
| colspan=3 | Vacant

|- style="height:2em"
| Appointed to continue Stone's term.Lost election to finish Stone's term.
| nowrap | Apr 30, 1918 –Nov 5, 1918
|  | Democratic
| align=right | Xenophon P. Wilfley
! 17

|- style="height:2em"
| rowspan=2 | Elected in 1918 to finish Stone's term.
| rowspan=5 nowrap | Nov 6, 1918 –May 16, 1925
| rowspan=5  | Republican
| rowspan=5 align=right | Selden P. Spencer
! rowspan=5 | 18

|- style="height:2em"
| 

|- style="height:2em"
| 
| rowspan=6 | 18
| rowspan=3 | Re-elected in 1920.Died.

|- style="height:2em"
| rowspan=6 | Re-elected in 1922.Retired.
| rowspan=6 | 18
| 

|- style="height:2em"
| rowspan=4 

|- style="height:2em"
|  
| nowrap | May 16, 1925 –May 25, 1925
| colspan=3 | Vacant

|- style="height:2em"
| Appointed to continue Spencer's term.Lost elections to finish Spencer's term and to the next term.
| nowrap | May 25, 1925 –Dec 5, 1926
|  | Republican
| align=right | George H. Williams
! 19

|- style="height:2em"
| Elected to finish Spencer's term.
| rowspan=4 nowrap | Dec 6, 1926 –Feb 3, 1933
| rowspan=4  | Democratic
| rowspan=4 align=right | Harry B. Hawes
! rowspan=4 | 20

|- style="height:2em"
| 
| rowspan=4 | 19
| rowspan=3 | Also elected to the next term in 1926.Retired, then resigned early.

|- style="height:2em"
! rowspan=4 | 9
| rowspan=4 align=left | Roscoe C. Patterson
| rowspan=4  | Republican
| rowspan=4 nowrap | Mar 4, 1929 –Jan 3, 1935
| rowspan=4 | Elected in 1928.Lost re-election.
| rowspan=4 | 19
| 

|- style="height:2em"
| rowspan=2 

|- style="height:2em"
| Appointed to finish Hawes's term, having already been elected to the next term.
| rowspan=7 nowrap | Feb 3, 1933 –Jan 3, 1945
| rowspan=7  | Democratic
| rowspan=7 align=right | Joel B. Clark
! rowspan=7 | 21

|- style="height:2em"
| 
| rowspan=3 | 20
| rowspan=3 | Elected in 1932.

|- style="height:2em"
! rowspan=6 | 10
| rowspan=6 align=left | Harry S. Truman
| rowspan=6  | Democratic
| rowspan=6 nowrap | Jan 3, 1935 –Jan 17, 1945
| rowspan=3 | Elected in 1934.
| rowspan=3 | 20
| 

|- style="height:2em"
| 

|- style="height:2em"
| 
| rowspan=3 | 21
| rowspan=3 | Re-elected in 1938.Lost renomination.

|- style="height:2em"
| rowspan=3 | Re-elected in 1940.Resigned to become U.S. Vice President.
| rowspan=4 | 21
| 

|- style="height:2em"
| 

|- style="height:2em"
| rowspan=2 
| rowspan=4 | 22
| rowspan=4 | Elected in 1944.Lost re-election.
| rowspan=4 nowrap | Jan 3, 1945 –Jan 3, 1951
| rowspan=4  | Republican
| rowspan=4 align=right | Forrest C. Donnell
! rowspan=4 | 22

|- style="height:2em"
! 11
| align=left | Frank P. Briggs
|  | Democratic
| nowrap | Jan 18, 1945 –Jan 3, 1947
| Appointed to finish Truman's term.Lost election to the next term.

|- style="height:2em"
! rowspan=3 | 12
| rowspan=3 align=left | James P. Kem
| rowspan=3  | Republican
| rowspan=3 nowrap | Jan 3, 1947 –Jan 3, 1953
| rowspan=3 | Elected in 1946.Lost re-election.
| rowspan=3 | 22
| 

|- style="height:2em"
| 

|- style="height:2em"
| 
| rowspan=3 | 23
| rowspan=3 | Elected in 1950.
| rowspan=5 nowrap | Jan 3, 1951 –Sep 13, 1960
| rowspan=5  | Democratic
| rowspan=5 align=right | Thomas Hennings
! rowspan=5 | 23

|- style="height:2em"
! rowspan=15 | 13
| rowspan=15 align=left | Stuart Symington
| rowspan=15  | Democratic
| rowspan=15 nowrap | Jan 3, 1953 –Dec 27, 1976
| rowspan=3 | Elected in 1952.
| rowspan=3 | 23
| 

|- style="height:2em"
| 

|- style="height:2em"
| 
| rowspan=5 | 24
| rowspan=2 | Re-elected in 1956.Died.

|- style="height:2em"
| rowspan=5 | Elected in 1958.
| rowspan=5 | 24
| rowspan=3 

|- style="height:2em"
|  
| nowrap | Sep 13, 1960 –Sep 23, 1960
| colspan=3 | Vacant

|- style="height:2em"
| rowspan=2 | Appointed to continue Henning's term.Elected to finish Henning's term.
| rowspan=5 nowrap | Sep 23, 1960 –Dec 27, 1968
| rowspan=5  | Democratic
| rowspan=5 align=right | Edward V. Long
! rowspan=5 | 24

|- style="height:2em"
| 

|- style="height:2em"
| 
| rowspan=4 | 25
| rowspan=3 | Re-elected in 1962.Lost renomination, and resigned early.

|- style="height:2em"
| rowspan=4 | Elected in 1964.
| rowspan=4 | 25
| 

|- style="height:2em"
| rowspan=2 

|- style="height:2em"
| Appointed to finish Long's term, having been elected to next term.
| rowspan=11 nowrap | Dec 28, 1968 –Jan 3, 1987
| rowspan=11  | Democratic
| rowspan=11 align=right | Thomas Eagleton
! rowspan=11 | 25

|- style="height:2em"
| 
| rowspan=3 | 26
| rowspan=3 | Elected in 1968.

|- style="height:2em"
| rowspan=3 | Elected in 1970.Retired, then resigned early to give successor preferential seniority.
| rowspan=4 | 26
| 

|- style="height:2em"
| 

|- style="height:2em"
| rowspan=2 
| rowspan=4 | 27
| rowspan=4 | Re-elected in 1974.

|- style="height:2em"
! rowspan=10 | 14
| rowspan=10 align=left | John Danforth
| rowspan=10  | Republican
| rowspan=10 nowrap | Dec 27, 1976 –Jan 3, 1995
| Appointed early to finish Symington's term, having already been elected to the next term.

|- style="height:2em"
| rowspan=3 | Elected in 1976.
| rowspan=3 | 27
| 

|- style="height:2em"
| 

|- style="height:2em"
| 
| rowspan=3 | 28
| rowspan=3 | Re-elected in 1980.Retired.

|- style="height:2em"
| rowspan=3 | Re-elected in 1982.
| rowspan=3 | 28
| 

|- style="height:2em"
| 

|- style="height:2em"
| 
| rowspan=3 | 29
| rowspan=3 | Elected in 1986.
| rowspan=13 nowrap | Jan 3, 1987 –Jan 3, 2011
| rowspan=13  | Republican
| rowspan=13 align=right | Kit Bond
! rowspan=13 | 26

|- style="height:2em"
| rowspan=3 | Re-elected in 1988.Retired.
| rowspan=3 | 29
| 

|- style="height:2em"
| 

|- style="height:2em"
| 
| rowspan=3 | 30
| rowspan=3 | Re-elected in 1992.

|- style="height:2em"
! rowspan=3 | 15
| rowspan=3 align=left | John Ashcroft
| rowspan=3  | Republican
| rowspan=3 nowrap | Jan 3, 1995 –Jan 3, 2001
| rowspan=3 | Elected in 1994.Lost re-election.
| rowspan=3 | 30
| 

|- style="height:2em"
| 

|- style="height:2em"
| 
| rowspan=4 | 31
| rowspan=4 | Re-elected in 1998.

|- style="height:2em"
! 16
| align=left | Jean Carnahan
|  | Democratic
| nowrap | Jan 3, 2001 –Nov 23, 2002
| Appointed to begin the term of her husband, Mel Carnahan (D), who was posthumously elected in 2000.Lost election to finish her husband's term.
| rowspan=4 | 31
| rowspan=2 

|- style="height:2em"
! rowspan=3 | 17
| rowspan=3 align=left | Jim Talent
| rowspan=3  | Republican
| rowspan=3 nowrap | Nov 23, 2002 –Jan 3, 2007
| rowspan=3 | Elected in 2002 to finish Mel Carnahan's term.Lost re-election.

|- style="height:2em"
| 

|- style="height:2em"
| 
| rowspan=3 | 32
| rowspan=3 | Re-elected in 2004.Retired.

|- style="height:2em"
! rowspan=6 | 18
| rowspan=6 align=left | Claire McCaskill
| rowspan=6  | Democratic
| rowspan=6 nowrap | Jan 3, 2007 –Jan 3, 2019
| rowspan=3 | Elected in 2006.
| rowspan=3 | 32
| 

|- style="height:2em"
| 

|- style="height:2em"
| 
| rowspan=3 | 33
| rowspan=3 | Elected in 2010.
| rowspan=6 nowrap | Jan 3, 2011 –Jan 3, 2023
| rowspan=6  | Republican
| rowspan=6 align=right | Roy Blunt
! rowspan=6 | 27

|- style="height:2em"
| rowspan=3 | Re-elected in 2012.Lost re-election.
| rowspan=3 | 33
| 

|- style="height:2em"
| 

|- style="height:2em"
| 
| rowspan=3 | 34
| rowspan=3 | Re-elected in 2016.Retired.

|- style="height:2em"
! rowspan=3 | 19
| rowspan=3 align=left | Josh Hawley
| rowspan=3  | Republican
| rowspan=3 nowrap | Jan 3, 2019 –Present
| rowspan=3 | Elected in 2018.
| rowspan=3 | 34
| 

|- style="height:2em"
| 

|- style="height:2em"
| 
| rowspan=3 | 35
| rowspan=3 | Elected in 2022.
| rowspan=3 nowrap | Jan 3, 2023 –Present
| rowspan=3  | Republican
| rowspan=3 align=right | Eric Schmitt
! rowspan=3 | 28

|- style="height:2em"
| rowspan=3 colspan=5 | To be determined in the 2024 election.
| rowspan=3| 35
| 

|- style="height:2em"
| 

|- style="height:2em"
| 
| 36
| colspan=5 | To be determined in the 2028 election.

See also

 List of United States representatives from Missouri
 United States congressional delegations from Missouri
 Elections in Missouri

References

 
United States Senators
Missouri